USS Meyer (DD-279) was a  built for the United States Navy during World War I.

Description
The Clemson class was a repeat of the preceding  although more fuel capacity was added. They had a crew of 6 officers and 108 enlisted men.

Performance differed radically between the ships of the class, often due to poor workmanship. The Clemson class was powered by two steam turbines, each driving one propeller shaft, using steam provided by four water-tube boilers.

The ships were armed with four 4-inch (102 mm) guns in single mounts and were fitted with two  1-pounder guns for anti-aircraft defense. In many ships a shortage of 1-pounders caused them to be replaced by 3-inch (76 mm) guns. Their primary weapon, though, was their torpedo battery of a dozen 21 inch (533 mm) torpedo tubes in four triple mounts. They also carried a pair of depth charge rails. A "Y-gun" depth charge thrower was added to many ships.

Construction and career
Meyer, named for George von Lengerke Meyer, was laid down 6 February 1919 at the Bethlehem Shipbuilding Corporation, Squantum, Massachusetts; launched 18 July 1919; sponsored by Mrs. C. R. P. Rodgers, daughter of Mr. Meyer; and commissioned 17 December 1919.

After an east coast shakedown, Meyer departed Boston, Massachusetts 9 February 1920 for the west coast. She arrived San Diego, California 1 April only to depart soon afterward for a cruise to San Francisco, California and various Alaskan ports. Returning to San Diego 18 August, she continued to operate along the west coast, ranging from Alaska to Panama, with occasional voyages to Hawaii, for the next 8 and a half years. During that time her assignments were varied and in August, 1927, Meyer served as one of the ships used to assist pilots participating in the Dole Race from the mainland to Hawaii. Early in 1929 the destroyer began inactivation overhaul and on 15 May 1929 was decommissioned at San Diego. On 17 June she was towed to Mare Island for scrapping. Struck 25 November 1930, her materials were sold 25 February 1932.

As of 2019, no other ships have been named Meyer.

Meyer can be briefly seen in the movie, "Tin Pan Alley", just after the two male leads enlist in the army to serve in WW1.  About 1 hour 15 mins into the film .

Notes

References

External links

http://www.navsource.org/archives/05/279.htm

 

Clemson-class destroyers
Ships built in Quincy, Massachusetts
1919 ships